Stage results and recaps of the 2006 Vuelta a España from Stage 12 to Stage 21.

Stages

Stage 12 
Stage 12, 07-09-2006: Aranda de Duero - Guadalajara, 162 km.

Stage 13 
Stage 13, 08-09-2006: Guadalajara - Cuenca, 170 km.

Stage 14 
Stage 14, 09-09-2006: Cuenca - Cuenca, 33 km. (ITT)

Stage 15 
Stage 15, 10-09-2006: Motilla del Palancar - Factoría Ford (Almussafes), 175 km.

Stage 16 
Stage 16, 12-09-2006: Almería - Observatorio Astronómico de Calar Alto, 145 km.

Stage 17 
Stage 17, 13-09-2006: Adra - Granada, 167 km.

Stage 18 
Stage 18, 14-09-2006: Granada - Sierra de la Pandera, 153 km.

Stage 19 
Stage 19, 15-09-2006: Jaén - Ciudad Real, 195 km.

Stage 20 
Stage 20, 16-09-2006: Rivas Futura - Rivas Vaciamadrid, 28 km. (ITT)

Stage 21 
Stage 21, 17-09-2006: Madrid - Madrid, 150 km

See also
2006 Vuelta a España
2006 Vuelta a España, Stage 1 to Stage 11

References
cyclingnews

2006 Vuelta a España
2006